Insulin aspart, sold under the brand name NovoLog and Fiasp, among others, is a modified type of medical insulin used to treat type 1 and type 2 diabetes. It is generally used by injection under the skin but may also be used by injection into a vein. Maximum effect occurs after about 1–3 hours and lasts for 3–5 hours. Generally a longer-acting insulin like insulin NPH is also needed.

Common side effects include low blood sugar, allergic reactions, itchiness, and pain at the site of injection. Other serious side effects may include low blood potassium. Use in pregnancy and breastfeeding is generally safe. It works the same as human insulin by increasing the amount of glucose that tissues take in and decreasing the amount of glucose made by the liver. It is a manufactured form of human insulin; where a single amino acid has been changed, specifically a proline with an aspartic acid at the B28 position.

Insulin aspart was approved for medical use in the United States in 2000. In 2020, it was the 80th most commonly prescribed medication in the United States, with more than 9million prescriptions. Manufacturing involves yeast, which have had the gene for insulin aspart put into their genome. This yeast then makes the insulin, which is harvested from the bioreactor.

Medical uses 
, there is a lack of compelling evidence to conclude superiority of insulin aspart over human insulin in type 2 DM. It is thus unclear why the shifting of people from human insulin to insulin aspart has occurred. In type 1 DM it appears to result in slightly better blood sugar control.

Onset of action 
The onset of action is approximately fifteen minutes, the peak action is reached in 45–90 minutes, and the duration is 3–5 hours. However, as with all insulin, these numbers are based on averages, and vary between individuals due to blood flow, injection site, temperature and exercise.

Side effects 
The safety of insulin aspart in people with diabetes is no different from for regular insulin. The side effects that are commonly associated with insulin therapy include: allergic reactions, injection site irritation, rashes, and hypoglycemia. The most common side effect is hypoglycemia. Long-term use of insulin, including insulin aspart, can cause lipodystrophy at the site of repeated injections or infusion. To reduce the risk of lipodystrophy, rotate the injection sites within the same region. Weight gain can also occur with the use of insulin aspart and it has been attributed to anabolic effects of insulin and a decrease in glucosuria. Use of insulin aspart has also been associated with sodium retention and edema.

Chemical properties 

The components of insulin aspart are as follows:
 Metal ion – zinc (19.6 μg/mL)
 Buffer – disodium hydrogen phosphate dihydrate (1.25 mg/mL)
 Preservatives – 3-methylphenol (m-cresol) (1.72 mg/mL) and phenol (1.50 mg/mL)
 Isotonicity agents – glycerin (16 mg/mL) and sodium chloride (0.58 mg/mL).

The pH of insulin aspart is 7.2–7.6.

Formulations 
Insulin aspart can be used in an insulin pump and insulin pen for subcutaneous injection. Additionally, it can be used with an injection port such as the I-port.

Insulin aspart has a more rapid onset, and a shorter duration of activity than normal human insulin. Therefore, insulin aspart given by injection should normally be used in a regimen with long-acting or intermediate insulin.  Insulin aspart can also be used with external insulin pumps. The insulin in reservoirs of insulin pumps and infusion sets should be changed every 48 hours to avoid insulin degradation and loss of preservative.

Temperature 
It has been debated whether or not insulin aspart should be kept refrigerated at all times. The manufacturer claims it can last 28 days without refrigeration, as long as it is kept below 86 °F / 30 °C. Above these temperatures, the potency of the insulin quickly degrades, rendering it less effective.

Variations 

NovoLog Mix 70/30 is a product which contains 30% insulin aspart and 70% insulin aspart protamine. The insulin aspart protamine portion is a crystalline form of insulin aspart, which delays the action of the insulin, giving it a prolonged absorption profile after injection. The combination of the fast-acting form and the long-acting form allows the patient to receive fewer injections over the course of the day.

The components of NovoLog Mix 70/30 are as follows:
 Metal ion – zinc (19.6 μg/mL)
 Buffer – dibasic sodium phosphate (1.25 mg/mL)
 Preservatives – m-cresol (1.72 mg/mL) and phenol (1.50 mg/mL)
 Isotonicity agents – sodium chloride (0.58 mg/mL) and mannitol (36.4 mg/mL)
 Modifying protein – protamine (0.33 mg/mL)

The pH is 7.2–7.44.

NovoLog Mix is marketed to be used with the Novo Nordisk FlexPen. The onset of action is less than 30 minutes, the peak action is reached in 1–4 hours, and the duration is less than 24 hours. NovoLog Mix is marketed in some countries as NovoMix 30.

NovoRapid is produced in Saccharomyces cerevisiae by recombinant DNA technology.

Biosimilars 
On 10 December 2020, the Committee for Medicinal Products for Human Use (CHMP) of the European Medicines Agency (EMA) adopted a positive opinion, recommending the granting of a marketing authorization for the medicinal product Kixelle, intended for the treatment of diabetes mellitus. The applicant for this medicinal product is Mylan IRE Healthcare Limited. Kixelle was approved for medical use in the European Union in February 2021. Kixelle was renamed to Kirsty.

Trurapi was approved for medical use in Canada in October 2020.

Truvelog and Truvelog Solostar were approved for medical use in Australia in October 2020.

In October 2021, Kirsty was approved for medical use in Canada.

On 24 February 2022, the Committee for Medicinal Products for Human Use (CHMP) of the European Medicines Agency adopted a positive opinion, recommending the granting of a marketing authorization for the medicinal product Truvelog Mix 30, intended for the treatment of diabetes mellitus. The applicant for this medicinal product is sanofi-aventis groupe. It was approved for medical use in the European Union in April 2022.

References

External links
 

Insulin receptor agonists
Insulin therapies
Diabetes
Human proteins
Recombinant proteins
Peptide hormones
Wikipedia medicine articles ready to translate
World Health Organization essential medicines